Vatne Church is a parish church of the Church of Norway in Ålesund Municipality in Møre og Romsdal county, Norway. It is located in the village of Vatne. It is the church for the Vatne parish which is part of the Nordre Sunnmøre prosti (deanery) in the Diocese of Møre. The white, wooden church was built in a long church design in 1868 using plans drawn up by the architect Fritz Meinhardt who also had some input from the famous architect Jacob Wilhelm Nordan. The church seats about 550 people.

History
The earliest existing historical records of the church date back to 1432, but it was not a new church at that time. It may have been first constructed in the 14th century. At some point during the 1500s or 1600s, the original long church design was enlarged by adding a timber-framed transept to create a cruciform design. At the same time, the old choir was torn down and a new timber-framed choir was built in its place.

By the 1760s, the old church was in need of replacement. It was decided that new church would be constructed on a site  to the west of the old church, on the other side of the lake. The new location at Osgota would be a better, more convenient location for the residents of the parish. In 1760–1761, the old church was torn down at the old site and the new church was built, likely reusing materials from the old building. The new church was a timber-framed cruciform design. The new building was consecrated on 28 June 1761.

By the 1860s, the church had become too small for the parish. In 1868, the old church was torn down and a new church was constructed on the same site. The new church was a wooden long church that was based on the design of the nearby Skodje Church. The church was designed by the architect Fritz Meinhardt. It happens that Jacob Wilhelm Nordan is also mentioned in connection with the church construction, which likely means that Nordan corrected some of Meinhardt's drawings. The lead builder for the project was Gustav Olsen. From the outside, the church can look like a cruciform church with very short cross arms, but it is set up as a long church on the inside. The new building was consecrated on 13 December 1868.

See also
List of churches in Møre

References

Buildings and structures in Ålesund
Churches in Møre og Romsdal
Long churches in Norway
Wooden churches in Norway
19th-century Church of Norway church buildings
Churches completed in 1868
14th-century establishments in Norway